Wade Wilson may refer to:

Wade Wilson (American football) (1959–2019), retired American football player
Wade DeFarge, the alter ego of the fictional comic character Ravager, sometimes referred to by the surname of his half-brother, "Wilson"
Wade Wilson, the alter ego of fictional comic character Deadpool